The King Arthur Baking Company, formerly The King Arthur Flour Company, is an American supplier of flour, ingredients, baking mixes, cookbooks, and baked goods. The company was founded in Boston, Massachusetts in 1790, and is now based in Norwich, Vermont.

History 
The King Arthur Flour Company was founded in 1790 in Boston, Massachusetts, by Henry Wood. Wood was primarily an importer and distributor, originally of English-milled flour. The business grew quickly, and Wood took on a partner in the early 1790s, forming Henry Wood & Company. Benjamin F. Sands took over the company in 1870, renaming it to reflect his ownership interest. In 1895, the company was reorganized as a joint-stock company, named Sands, Taylor & Wood Company after its then owners: Orin Sands, Mark Taylor, and George Wood (no relation to Henry Wood).

In 1896, Sands, Taylor & Wood introduced a new brand of premium flour. George Wood had attended a performance of the musical King Arthur and the Knights of the Round Table, which inspired the name of the new product: King Arthur Flour.  The brand was introduced at the Boston Food Fair on September 10, 1896, to substantial commercial success.

With Orin Sands's death in 1917, control of the company passed to his son, Frank E. Sands, grandfather of current chairman Frank E. Sands II. As the market for retail flour declined, the company expanded into the commercial bakery market, first with wholesale flours and later (in the 1960s) into commercial baking equipment. Sands, Taylor & Wood also introduced other retail food products under the King Arthur name, including a line of coffee.

Sands, Taylor & Wood acquired Joseph Middleby, a maker of baking supplies, such as prepared pie fillings, in 1973. Three years later, that business was expanded with the purchase of H.A. Johnson. As interest rates rose through the 1970s, financial pressures forced the company to change strategy, and in 1978 then-president Frank E. Sands II sold off all but the core flour business and relocated the company from Brighton, Massachusetts, to Norwich, Vermont.

Sands, Taylor & Wood Company converted to an employee-owned business structure in 1996, and also changed its name to The King Arthur Flour Co., Inc., reflecting its principal brand. The company has been 100% employee-owned through an Employee Stock Ownership Plan (ESOP) since 2004. Employees who log more than 800 hours of work per year following their first year of employment are eligible to become owners through the ESOP.

The employee-owned company has been named one of the Best Places to Work in Vermont every year since the inception of the award in 2006.

Flagship bakery and store
In 2000, King Arthur Flour opened a new flagship bakery, café, retail store, and school in Norwich, Vermont, which offers classes and demonstrations to bakers of all skill levels.

2020 Rebranding 
In July 2020 King Arthur Flour changed its name to The King Arthur Baking Company Inc. to better reflect its products and services other than flour, and the logo was changed from a medieval knight riding a charger to a wheat-themed crown.

The change coincidentally was launched several months into the COVID-19 pandemic, when retail flour sales had exploded.  Because of the pandemic's effect on home baking – King Arthur's flour sales in March 2020 were approximately twenty times what the previous year's sales had been, and industry-wide, sales of flour, yeast, and many other baking supplies in the US had doubled or tripled – the re-branding happened during a time of significant and unexpected sales growth. These explosions in sales came from people who started baking at home, as all the established bakeries closed up to prevent the spread of the virus.

Before the pandemic, rebranding studies found that many of their customers engaged in stress baking, meaning that they baked at home to bring joy to themselves and others during stressful times.

As of 2019, leadership at King Arthur Flour includes Carrie Brisson, head baker.

Activities 

In addition to its flour business, King Arthur Flour also sells baking equipment, ingredients, baking mixes, and cookbooks through its catalog, The Baker's Catalogue, website, and at its flagship store, The Baker's Store, located in Norwich, Vermont.

The company has also published four cookbooks, including the King Arthur 200th Anniversary Cookbook and the King Arthur Flour Baker's Companion, the latter of which was a James Beard Award winner for Cookbook of the Year in 2003.

The primary marketing strategy is promoting customer engagement by providing informative online content and social media connections.  They have sold flour and other baking supplies directly to consumers since the 1990s.  During 2020, to support customers during the COVID-19 pandemic and their upcoming re-branding announcement, they added more online content, such as new recipes and baking tutorials.  Page views in the spring were triple the usual level; pages about sourdough bread were particularly popular.

References

External links 
 

1790 establishments in Massachusetts
Baking mixes
Food and drink companies based in Vermont
American companies established in 1790
Employee-owned companies of the United States
Food and drink companies of the United States
Buildings and structures in Norwich, Vermont
Tourist attractions in Windsor County, Vermont
Public benefit corporations based in the United States